Karolin Ohlsson  (born 29 August 1991) is a Swedish orienteering competitor who competes internationally. She became world champion in the sprint relay in 2018.

Personal life
Ohlsson was born in Stockholm, and works as a silversmith in Stockholm.

Career
Ohlsson won a silver medal in the relay at the 2014 European Orienteering Championships in Portugal with the Swedish team, and placed 12th in the sprint, and 17th in the long distance. At the 2015 World Orienteering Championships in Inverness, she placed fifth in the mixed sprint relay, and tenth in the sprint final. In the 2016 European Championships she placed 20th in the sprint and 35th in the long distance, and she placed 13th in the sprint at the 2016 World Orienteering Championships in Strömstad, Sweden. She competed at the 2017 World Orienteering Championships in Tartu, Estonia, where she placed 11th in the sprint, and 27th in the long distance. 

At the 2018 European Orienteering Championships in Switzerland she won a silver medal in the mixed sprint relay, and a silver medal in women's relay. She placed eighth in the sprint and ninth in the long distance. She competed at the 2018 World Orienteering Championships in Latvia, where she placed fifth the sprint final, and won a gold medal in the mixed sprint relay, together with Emil Svensk, Jonas Leandersson and Tove Alexandersson. She was running the second leg in the women's relay at the 2018 World Championships, where Sweden won the silver medal, with Helena Bergman on the first leg and Tove Alexandersson on the final leg. She placed 21st in the middle course, and seventh in the long distance in the 2018 World Championships. In 2018 she was on the Järla IF club team which won the Tiomila relay.

She participated in World Games 2022 in Birmingham, Alabama where she won a silver medal in the Middle Distance and placed 4th in the Individual Sprint.

References

External links 

Swedish orienteers
Female orienteers
Foot orienteers
1991 births
Living people
Sportspeople from Stockholm
Swedish silversmiths
Women jewellers
Competitors at the 2022 World Games
World Games medalists in orienteering
World Games silver medalists